The Municipality of Trbovlje is a municipality in central Slovenia. The seat of the municipality is the town of Trbovlje.

Settlements
In addition to the municipal seat of Trbovlje, the municipality also includes the following settlements:

 Čebine
 Čeče
 Dobovec
 Gabrsko
 Klek
 Ključevica
 Knezdol
 Ojstro
 Ostenk
 Planinska Vas
 Prapreče
 Retje nad Trbovljami
 Škofja Riža
 Sveta Planina
 Vrhe
 Završje
 Župa

References

External links

 Municipality of Trbovlje website 

 
Trbovlje